Manuel White (born July 2, 1982) is a former American football fullback.  White attended Valencia High School in Santa Clarita, California. He played college football at the University of California, Los Angeles (UCLA) and was drafted in the fourth round of the 2005 NFL Draft by the Washington Redskins.

1982 births
Living people
People from Panorama City, Los Angeles
American football running backs
UCLA Bruins football players
University of California, Los Angeles alumni
Washington Redskins players